Palapallam is a panchayat town in Kanniyakumari district  in the state of Tamil Nadu, India.

Demographics
 India census, Palappallam had a population of 16,638. Males constitute 49% of the population and females 51%. Palappallam has an average literacy rate of 77%, higher than the national average of 59.5%; with 50% of the males and 50% of females literate. 11% of the population is under 6 years of age.

References

Cities and towns in Kanyakumari district